Rubén Pardo may refer to:
Rubén Pardo (racing driver) (born 1979), Mexican stock car racing driver
Rubén Pardo (footballer) (born 1992), Spanish footballer